Jacques Desrosiers (July 8, 1938 – June 11, 1996) was a Québécois Canadian singer and actor. Desrosiers was best known for playing the clown Patof in the Canadian television series Patofville. He was born in Montreal, Quebec.

Early career
Son of the comic comedian Pierre Desrosiers and brother of singers André Fontaine and Édouard Desrosiers (Édouard would later become a politician), Jacques Desrosiers begins in 1956 as imitator and cabaret artist on CBC/Radio-Canada television. He soon presents his shows, mixing fanciful songs, parodies and imitations, in the cabarets of Quebec, particularly at the Montreal Casa Loma.

Some of his parodies, such as La Java à Lumina, Le Peddler and La Machine à laver make the hit parade. In 1963-1964 he participates in a review called Zéro de conduite with Dominique Michel, Denise Filiatrault and Donald Lautrec, then in Clémence DesRochers's musical, Le Vol rose du flamant.

Television
Between 1968 and 1973, Jacques Desrosiers hosts several TV shows on CFTM channel 10, such as Les trois cloches, Vaudeville, Café terrasse and Madame est servie.

It is through the character of the clown Patof, created in January 1972 for the TV serie Le Cirque du Capitaine (CFTM, 1970), that Desrosiers becomes famous. He beats all the records of sale with the song Patof Blou, an adaptation of Roger Whittaker's Mammy Blue, and launches a serie of records made in association with Gilbert Chénier. He founds Les Entreprises Patof company, which launch on the market many products for children using the clown image.

On CFTM channel 10, Desrosiers hosted Patofville from 1973 till 1976, Patof raconte broadcast the weekends between 1975 and 1976, and Patof voyage from 1976 till 1977.

He later played Eugene for Monsieur Tranquille until 1978 when TVA axed the series due to clashing with the Ever-Popular Bobino starring Guy Sanche on rival Ici Radio-Canada Télé airing at the same timeslot.

Other accomplishments
He started playing some roles as comedian in TV series, notably in an episode of the serie L'amour avec un grand A in 1990, and in the fourth season of Scoop in 1995.

Jacques Desrosiers played in some Canadian movies such as C'est pas la faute à Jacques Cartier (1967), Après ski (1970), Le Party (1990) directed by Pierre Falardeau and La Florida (1993) directed by George Mihalka.

He also played some roles in comedy theatre pieces under the management of Gilles Latulippe.

Jacques Desrosiers died of lung and bone cancer on June 11, 1996.

Legacy
He was the subject of Mon oncle Patof, a 2021 television documentary produced by his nephew Serge Desrosiers (son of Édouard) and directed by Serge's wife Sandrine Béchade. The documentary revealed for the first time that Jacques Desrosiers was gay, and included the participation of his partner Pierre Bourque.

Filmography

Cinema and TV series 
 1957 Domino (TV series)
 1958 Cirque Boto (TV series)
 1963 Ça va éclater (end-of-year special with Dominique Michel, Denise Filiatrault and Donald Lautrec)
 1966 YUL 871
 1967 Moi et l'autre (TV series)
 1967 It Isn't Jacques Cartier's Fault (C'est pas la faute à Jacques Cartier)
 1968 Le Paradis terrestre (TV series)
 1968 Les trois cloches (TV series)
 1969-1970 Entre nous (TV series)
 1969-1970 Vaudeville (TV series)
 1970 Bon appétit (TV series)
 1971 Après-Ski
 1971 Finalement...
 1972 Café Terrasse (TV series)
 1972-1973 Le cirque du Capitaine (TV series)
 1972 Les Indrogables
 1972 The Rebels (Quelques arpents de neige)
 1972-1973 Madame est servie (TV series)
 1973-1976 Patofville (TV series)
 1974 C'est jeune et ça sait tout!
 1975-1976 Patof raconte (TV series)
 1976-1977 Patof voyage (TV series)
 1976 Chère Isabelle (TV series)
 1977-1978 Monsieur Tranquille (TV series)
 1979 Chez Denise (TV series)
 1990 Avec un grand A (TV series), episode called "Michel et François"
 1990 The Party (Le Party)
 1993 La Florida
 1995 Scoop IV (TV series)

DVD 
 2007 Le Party (Maple pictures)
 2007 C'est pas la faute à Jacques-Cartier (Carte Blanche collection, ONF)
 2008 Après-Ski (Equinoxe Films)
 2008 La Florida (Alliance)
 2011 Bonjour Patof (Musicor Produits Spéciaux)

Discography

Albums

Singles

Compilations

Collaborations and performances as guest star

Complete discography 
 Jacques Desrosiers French Discography
 Patof French Discography
 Monsieur Tranquille French Discography

Theatre 
 195? Altitude 3200, by Julien Luchaire.
 1958 Les oiseaux de lune, by Marcel Aymé (Comédie Canadienne)
 1963-1964 Zéro de conduite (musical review with Dominique Michel, Denise Filiatrault and Donald Lautrec)
 1964 Le vol rose du Flamant, a musical by Clémence DesRochers and Pierre F. Brault
 1989 La muselière, by Yvon Brochu (Théâtre Sainte-Adèle)
 1995 Femme demandée (Théâtre des Variétés)

Bibliography 
 Jacques Desrosiers, Millionnaire (autobiography), Boucherville, Les Éditions de Mortagne, 1981.

Awards and recognition 
 1972 Golden record (100,000 sales) for the single Patof Blou 
 1973 Golden record (100,000 sales) for the single Patof le roi des clowns 
 1997 A street in Quebec (Blainville) was named in his honor

References

External links
 French Blog about Patof and Jacques Desrosiers

1938 births
1996 deaths
Canadian children's television personalities
Canadian male stage actors
Canadian male television actors
Canadian television hosts
Comedians from Montreal
French Quebecers
Male actors from Montreal
Singers from Montreal
Television personalities from Montreal
French-language singers of Canada
Apex Records artists
20th-century Canadian male actors
20th-century Canadian male singers
20th-century Canadian comedians
Canadian gay actors
20th-century Canadian LGBT people
Canadian LGBT singers
Canadian gay musicians